Christopher Norris may refer to:

Christopher Norris (actress) (born 1953), American film and television actress
Christopher Norris (critic) (born 1947), British literary critic and theorist

See also
Christopher Morris (disambiguation)